The 1911 Purdue Boilermakers football team was an American football team which represented Purdue University during the 1911 college football season. In their second season under head coach Bill Horr, the Boilermakers compiled a 3–4 record, finished in sixth place in the Western Conference with a 1–3 record against conference opponents and outscored their opponents by a total of 58 to 48. R. W. Tavey was the team captain.

Schedule

References

Purdue
Purdue Boilermakers football seasons
Purdue Boilermakers football